Michael English may refer to:

Michael English (cricketer) (born 1995), Scottish cricketer
Michael English (illustrator) (1941–2009), British 1960s poster designer
Michael English (politician) (1930–2019), British Labour Member of Parliament for Nottingham West 1964–1983
Michael English (American singer) (born 1963), American Christian singer from North Carolina
Michael English (album), his eponymous album released in 1991
Michael English (Irish singer) (born 1979), Irish country singer